This is a list of flag bearers who have represented Mauritania at the Olympics.

Flag bearers carry the national flag of their country at the opening ceremony of the Olympic Games.

See also
Mauritania at the Olympics

References

Mauritania at the Olympics
Mauritania
Olympic flagbearers